Jernhatten - The Iron Hat - is a protected hill and view point on the peninsula, Djursland, in Denmark protruding into the sea, Kattegat between Denmark and Sweden. From the top of the hill, 49 meters above sea level, there is a view up and down the coast including and the island Hjelm as well as an inland view over the hilly southern Djursland area, called Mols.

The coastal hill Jernhatten is exposed to the sun, and at the same time located in the driest part of Denmark. This gives a microclimate that favors vegetation with similarities to what can be seen in South Eastern Europe. At the wind exposed top of the hill there is stunted beech tree growth with anemone, ivy, and wild apple trees. The northern and eastern part of the hill merges into a common, maintained through grazing, with primrose blossom in spring. At the foot of the  hill lies an elevated beach plain resulting from land uplift due to release of pressure when the heavy ice sheet covering large parts of Denmark melted away 10.000 years ago at the end of the last ice-age.

The coast down from Jernhatten - is known among anglers and divers, due to a varied sea bed with kelp and stones, giving favorable conditions for fish life. The stream Havmølle Å just south of Jernhatten has a run of sea trout. In the same area one can find the last signs of entrenchments from "Englandskrigene" 1807-1814 - a war with England, where most of the Danish fleet was lost. This place, as well as Jernhatten, is part of 266 hectares of protected land.

Hiking - From a small car park to the top of the hill there is a 300 meter footpath leading to the main viewpoint. The area is not overrun. A longer walk is over the top of the hill down along the coast to the coastal hills of Rugaard Forest, which can be seen from the viewpoint, going back the same way. This 8 kilometer round trip passes empty coastline and wooded hills with wellsprings running into the sea, and trees falling out over the stony beach and into the sea. On this stretch there is also a hill with angled beech trees, growing on unstable ball clay, that is slipping into the sea. The tidal difference in the area is normally negligible in the order of one foot, so one does not have to worry about being cut of, even though the beach down from Rugaard Forest is narrow to pass at some places. From Jernhatten and north the coastline is varied and empty up to the coastal town Grenaa and Grenaa Beach 20 kilometers further up the coast of Djursland. This stretch partly joins an international hiking and bicycle trail, the North Sea Trail starting in Sweden and ending in Spain.

References

Gyldendals Åbne Encyklopædi
Historiefaget.dk
Lystfiskernet.dk
Visitdjursland.com

Syddjurs Municipality
Protected areas of Denmark
Tourist attractions in Denmark
Tourist attractions in the Central Denmark Region
Hills of Denmark